HNLMS Evertsen was a  of the Royal Netherlands Navy.

Design
The main armament of the ship was three  guns in a double and single turret. Secondary armament included two single  guns and six single  guns.

Service history
The ship was laid down in 1893 at the Koninklijke Maatschappij De Schelde in Flushing and launched on 29 September 1894. The ship was commissioned on 1 February 1896. 4 February 1896 she and her sister ship  left for practice in the Mediterranean Sea. On 11 May 1896 during the harbor strikes in Rotterdam a ban on assembly was decreed. Two days later Kortenaer patrolled the Meuse. The ship was later relieved by her sister ships Evertsen,  and the police schooner Argus. 300 grenadiers were deployed during the strikes. The strikes were ended on 21 May.

On 5 May 1898 the ship left the port van Den Helder for a journey to Lisbon. The ship was there for the celebration of the discovery of the seaway to India by Vasco da Gama 400 years ago. The Portuguese king Carlos I and his wife made a visit to the ship while there.

From 1911 to 1913 the command over the ship was held by Captain lieutenant Jean Jacques Rambonnet who made several journeys on the North Sea with the ship. The ships was finally decommissioned in 1913.

Notes

References
Staatsbegrooting voor het dienstjaar 1897 (2.-VI.-5.)

Coastal defence ships of the Royal Netherlands Navy
1894 ships
Ships built in Vlissingen